Rabbi Shmuel Pinchasi is the rabbi of Mahane Yehuda Market neighborhood in Jerusalem, Israel and a Dayan in Beit Din Halichot Olam of Darchei David Beit Midrash. He is also the author of a number of Seforim and the president of Mishkan Levi Institution.
His sons are also accomplished authors; his son Moshe published the popular Torat HaYeshiva, relevant laws for students studying in yeshiva.

Works 
 Imrei Shefer, Hagot uMachshavah (6. vols)
 Imrei Shefer, Pirkei Avot (3 vols.) excellent expounding of Mishnayot
 veDaber Davar, on the laws of Amirah LeAkum on Shabbat
 Chaim vaChesed, a popular work on the laws of mourning
 Minchat Shmuel (3 vols.), responsa
 Pirkei Chinuch
 Kuntress vekhol HaChaim

References

External links 
 Lectures on LearnTorah.com
 Lectures on Kol HaLoshon
 Lectures on Darchei David's website
 Interview With Rabbi Shmuel Pinchasi

20th-century rabbis in Jerusalem
21st-century rabbis in Jerusalem
Living people
Israeli Mizrahi Jews
Sephardic Haredi rabbis in Israel
Year of birth missing (living people)